Raúl Gerardo Cuadra García (born 10 June 1953) is a Mexican politician from the National Action Party. From 2009 to 2012 he served as Deputy of the LXI Legislature of the Mexican Congress representing Aguascalientes.

References

1953 births
Living people
People from Aguascalientes City
Members of the Chamber of Deputies (Mexico)
National Action Party (Mexico) politicians
21st-century Mexican politicians
Politicians from Aguascalientes
Autonomous University of Aguascalientes alumni